Nick Basile (born February 10, 1978) is an American film director, producer, actor and screenwriter. Films produced and directed by Basile include The Adventures of Captain Steel,  Slasher Flick (featured on the NYC Horror Film Festival DVD); the futuristic thriller Beyond Dreams and the award-winning thriller/modern-day western The Man Who Knew Belle Starr. January 8, 2008 saw the DVD release of Basile's full-length documentary American Carny: True Tales from the Circus Sideshow, released by Cinema Epoch & Koch Entertainment. "American Carny" made its television debut on October 19, 2009 on the Documentary Channel.
Basile's next project is the psychological thriller DARK. The movie is set in New York City during the 2003 blackout. It stars Whitney Able, Alexandra Breckenridge, Brendan Sexton III, Michael Eklund and the rapper Redman. The movie is produced by Minerva Pictures in association with Renfield Productions. Famed Gremlins director Joe Dante serves as Executive Producer. The film held its world premiere at the 22nd Annual Oldenburg International Film Festival.

His acting credits include roles in the Off-Broadway production of Tony n' Tina's Wedding, H.P. Lovecraft (LoveCracked! The Movie) and has appeared in Shakespeare's Much Ado About Nothing at the Gene Frankel Theatre in NYC. Basile also appeared in the Barry Levinson film "The Bay".

Awards
2001: Best Director for a short subject, 2001 Atlantic City Film Festival, The Man Who Knew Belle Starr (based on the short story by author Richard Bausch)

References

americancarny.com
sideshowworld.com
backstage.com
theatermania.com
documentarychannel.com
darkthefilm.com
IMDB
hollywoodreporter.com
deadline.com
screenmediafilms.net
variety.com
fangoria.com

External links

American film directors
American film producers
1978 births
Living people